Forest Inn is a village located in Carbon County, Pennsylvania, south of Beltzville Lake. Country Junction retail store is located in the village.

Forest Inn uses the Lehighton zip code of 18235 and is located on U.S. Route 209.

References

Unincorporated communities in Carbon County, Pennsylvania
Unincorporated communities in Pennsylvania